General elections were held in Ecuador on 29 January 1984, with a second round of the presidential elections on 6 May. After finishing second in the first round, León Febres Cordero of the Social Christian Party won the run-off with 51.5% of the vote. The Democratic Left emerged as the largest faction in the National Congress, winning 24 of the 69 seats.

Results

President

National Congress

References

Elections in Ecuador
1984 in Ecuador
Ecuador